Andreas Arntzen (18 February 1777 – 14 December 1837) was a Norwegian politician.

He was born in Grue, and graduated as cand.jur. in Copenhagen in 1802. He then worked as an attorney, chief of police of Christiania, Supreme Court judge and even a timber merchant.

He was elected to the Norwegian Parliament in 1814, 1818 and 1821, representing the constituency of Christiania. During the 1821 term he was President of the Storting, together with Ingelbrecht Knudssøn, Carsten Tank, Christian M. Falsen and Valentin Sibbern.

On 1 December 1836 Arntzen was appointed Minister of Church Affairs and Education. He left on 1 June 1837, but returned a month later to become Minister of Justice and the Police. He died before the end of the year.

Andreas Arntzen was the father of jurist Carl Arntzen (1801–1877) and County Governor Karelius August Arntzen (1802–1875).

References

|-

|-

1777 births
1837 deaths
People from Grue, Norway
Government ministers of Norway
Presidents of the Storting
Members of the Storting
Politicians from Oslo
Supreme Court of Norway justices
Ministers of Justice of Norway
Ministers of Education of Norway